Juraj Kuhajdík (born 20 August 1984) is a Slovak football midfielder who plays Kuala Lumpur FA. He plays also Futsal for club PKP Košice.

External links
at mfkruzomberok.sk

References

1984 births
Living people
Slovak footballers
Association football midfielders
MFK Ružomberok players
Partizán Bardejov players
Slovak Super Liga players
Slovak men's futsal players